This is a list of the comic books published by Timely Comics (1939-1951) and Atlas Comics (1951-1961) prior to the companies' transformation into Marvel Comics in 1961.

Timely Comics

Atlas Comics

References

External links

Marvel Comics at the Big Comic Book DataBase

The Unofficial Handbook of Marvel Comics Creators